Grand Hotel Nevada is a 1935 comedy film directed by Jan Sviták and starring Lída Baarová, Otomar Korbelář, and Karel Dostal.

It was made in Prague by the Czech subsidiary of the Germany company UFA. The film's sets were designed by the art director Štěpán Kopecký.

Cast

References

Bibliography

External links 
 

1935 films
Films directed by Jan Sviták
1930s Czech-language films
Films of Nazi Germany
German comedy films
1935 comedy films
UFA GmbH films
German black-and-white films
1930s German films